Mamoon may refer to:

Al-Mamoon (786–833), seventh Abbasid caliph
Mamoon Abdul Gayoom (born 1937), President of Maldives 1978–2008
Mamoon al-Farkh (1958–2020), Syrian television, theatre and voice actor
Mamoon Hamid (born 1978), Pakistani-American venture capitalist
Mamoon Jaffar Tarar, Pakistani politician
Mamoon Kazi (1938–2014), Pakistani judge
Mamoon Rashid Sheikh (born 1958), Pakistani jurist
Mamoon Sadiq (born 1965), Pakistani sailor
Khaleel Mamoon (born 1948), Urdu poet
Margarita Mamoon (born 1995), Russian individual rhythmic gymnast
Muntassir Mamoon (born 1951), Bangladeshi writer, historian, professor at University of Dhaka
Razaq Mamoon (born 1964), author, political analyst and journalist from Afghanistan

See also
Mamoon Tower aka Baghdad Tower, a 205 m (673 ft) TV tower in Baghdad, Iraq
Mamoun (name)